Australia competed at the 2002 Winter Olympics in Salt Lake City, Utah, United States, winning its first two gold medals in the Winter Games.  It was the nation's best performance at the Winter Games prior to the 2010 Winter Olympics in Vancouver.

Overview 
Australia's first ever Winter Olympic gold, also the first such medal won by a competitor from any Southern Hemisphere country and semitropical nation was won by Steven Bradbury in the 1000 m short track speed skating.  Well off the pace of the medal favourites, Bradbury was positioned at the rear in the semifinal, only to see his competitors crash into each other, allowing him through to the final.  Again well off the pace in the final all four other competitors crashed out at the final corner, leaving a shocked Bradbury to take the gold medal. Bradbury was also part of the 1994 relay team that won Australia's first Winter Olympics medal.

Alisa Camplin, who hadn't won a world cup event before and was so nervous she didn't eat dinner the night before the final, won the second gold, in aerial skiing.  Jacqui Cooper was previously a favourite, but she injured herself before the competition.

Jenny Owens had a top 10 result, finishing 9th in the combined downhill event, the second best performance by any Australian at an Olympic Games.
 
Australia competed in alpine skiing, figure skating, freestyle skiing, short track speed skating, and snowboarding. This was the fewest sports Australia had competed in since 1984. No Australian cross-country skiers competed in the Olympics for the first time since 1976, and no bobsledders competed for the first time since Australia's debut in 1988. Australian bobsledder Will Alstergren said "We also beat half the teams currently in Salt Lake City, but unfortunately we couldn't meet the very high standard of the AOC, the Australian Olympic Committee". Australian selection standards was also listed as a factor for Australia not competing in cross-country skiing at Salt Lake City.

During the 2002 Winter Olympics, the Australian broadcaster, the Seven Network, included in its coverage an irreverent talk show called The Ice Dream, which interviewed several celebrities and promoted the Smiggin Holes 2010 Winter Olympic bid. Bradbury's and Camplin's triumphs were celebrated by Australia Post issuing stamps of them, which followed on from them issuing stamps of Australian gold medallists at the 2000 Sydney Olympics. They were produced by high-speed offset stamp-printing, unlike the digitally produced 2000 stamps. Bradbury's stamp was issued on 20 February, and Camplin's was issued on 22 February, four days after their respective victories. Each received A$20,000 for the use of their image. Bradbury said "Should get me a car. I haven't had a car for a long time." and later described having a stamp issued as "a great honour". Camplin was also delighted, saying "For us to be put in with the summer Olympians who had their stamps and the previous 39 sporting legends who've had their stamps is amazing."

Medalists

Alpine skiing

Men

Women

Figure skating

Freestyle skiing

Alisa Camplin provided Australia with its second gold medal for the games.

Men

Women

Short track speed skating

Steven Bradbury won Australia's and the Southern Hemisphere's first Winter Olympics gold medal in the 1000 metres event. Richard Goerlitz also attended these games, but did not compete.

Men

Snowboarding 

Parallel GS

See also

Australia at the Winter Olympics

References

External links
Australia NOC
Olympic Winter Institute of Australia
 "The Compendium: Official Australian Olympic Statistics 1896-2002" Australian Olympic Committee 
 "Steven Bradbury: Last Man Standing" by Gary Smart and Steven Bradbury , 2005.
 Aussie golds in Winter games bring more instant stamps by Glen Stephens. Linn's stamp news. 11 March 2002.
 "Gold medallists get framed stamps" Australian Olympic Committee 25 February 2002.
 She comes from the land Down Under : Aussie aerialist Camplin captures gold in dramatic fashion
 The Sports Factor - interview with Will Alstergren
 XC Files: No Australian Cross Country Skiers... 7 February 2002.

Nations at the 2002 Winter Olympics
2002
Winter sports in Australia
2002 in Australian sport